Samuel Putnam Avery (1822–1904) was an American connoisseur and dealer in art.

Biography
Samuel Putnam Avery was born in New York City on March 17, 1822. where he studied wood and copper engraving and was extensively employed by leading publishers.  He married the artist-collector Mary Ann Ogden in 1844 and began business as a dealer in art in 1865.  In 1867 Mr. Avery was appointed commissioner in charge of the American art department of the Exposition Universelle in Paris.  He was a founding, and for a long time, trustee of the Metropolitan Museum of Art and was a life member of important scientific, artistic and educational associations.  He founded the Avery Architectural Library at Columbia University in memory of his son Henry Ogden Avery, an architect of note, who died in 1890.  In 1900 he donated his collection of 17,775 etchings and lithographs to the New York Public Library.

Avery died at his home in New York City on August 11, 1904.

In 1912 Avery Hall, in memory of father and son, was erected on the Columbia campus.  Its first floor houses the Avery Library, now rated the richest collection in the country of works on architecture and the allied arts.

References

External links

 
Samuel Putnam Avery papers, 1857-1902 from the Smithsonian Archives of American Art
 
Samuel Putnam Avery papers from The Metropolitan Museum of Art Libraries, including many letters to Putnam
A fully digitized scrapbook of Samuel Putnam Avery paintings from The Metropolitan Museum of Art Libraries
Samuel Putnam Avery Diaries, 1871-1882 from The Metropolitan Museum of Art Libraries.

People associated with the Metropolitan Museum of Art
American engravers
Artists from New York City
1822 births
1904 deaths
American art dealers
19th-century American businesspeople